Kesava Pillai Anilkumar is a South African educator and politician who has been a Member of the Eastern Cape Provincial Legislature since 30 August 2019. Anilkumar is a member of the African National Congress.

Career 
He worked for the Department of Education for 30 years. He was first employed as a teacher and later became head of the department.

Political career 
Anilkumar is a member of the African National Congress. Within the party's Rubusana region, he was chairperson and treasurer. He was a member of the party's subcommittee on education. Anilkumar also served on the provincial committee of South African Democratic Teachers Union (SADTU).

On 30 August 2019, he was sworn in as a member of the Eastern Cape Provincial Legislature, filling the seat that was made vacant by the death of Ncediwe Nobevu-Booi in July 2019.

References

External links 

Living people
Year of birth missing (living people)
African National Congress politicians
Members of the Eastern Cape Provincial Legislature
21st-century South African politicians
21st-century South African educators
South African politicians of Indian descent